Germonea is a genus of sea snails, marine gastropod mollusks in the family Buccinidae.

Species
Species within the genus Germonea include:
 Germonea rachelae Harasewych & Kantor, 2004

References

 Engl, W. (2012). Shells of Antarctica. Hackenheim: Conchbooks. 402 pp.

External links
 Harasewych M.G. & Kantor Y. I. (2004). "The deep-sea Buccinoidea (Gastropoda: Neogastropoda) of the Scotia Sea and adjacent abyssal plains and trenches". The Nautilus 118(1): 1-42. [https://archive.org/stream/nautilus118119amer#page/n29/mode/2up page 20

Buccinidae